White-Bear-King-Valemon (Kvitebjørn kong Valemon) is a Norwegian fairy tale. The tale was published as No. 90 in Asbjørnsen and Moe's Norske Folke-Eventyr. Ny Samling (1871). George Webbe Dasent translated it for his Tales from the Fjeld.

The familiar version was collected by the artist August Schneider in 1870 from Setesdal. Jørgen Moe collected a variant of the tale from Bygland, summarized in the 2nd edition of Norske Folke-Eventyr (1852).

It is Aarne-Thompson type 425A, "The Animal (Monster) as Bridegroom". A similar Norwegian tale that exhibits this motif is East of the Sun and West of the Moon (Asbjørnsen & Moe, No. 41). Others of this type include: The Brown Bear of Norway, The Daughter of the Skies, The Enchanted Pig, The Tale of the Hoodie, Master Semolina, The Enchanted Snake, The Sprig of Rosemary, and The Black Bull of Norroway.

Synopsis
A king had two ugly and mean daughters and one, the youngest, who was beautiful and gentle. She dreamed of a golden wreath. Her father set goldsmiths to make it, but none of them matched her dream. Then she saw a white bear in the woods and it had the wreath. The bear would not give it to her before she agreed to go away with him, and got three days to prepare for the trip. The daughter did not care for anything as long as she had the wreath, and her father was glad of her happiness and thought he could keep off the bear, but when it arrived, it attacked the king's army and defeated them, unscathed.

The king sent out his oldest daughter. The bear took her on its back and rushed off with her, but asked her if she had ever sat softer or seen clearer, and she said she had, on her mother's lap, and at her father's court; so the white bear brought her back to the castle.

The next Thursday it came again, and the king tried his second daughter, and she also failed. The third Thursday, the king had sent his third daughter, and she had never sat softer or seen clearer, so it took her to its castle. Every night, it turned into a man and came to her bed in the dark.

Every year, the princess had a child, but as soon as the baby was born, the bear rushed away with it. At the end of three years, she asked to visit her parents. There, her mother gave her a candle so that she could see him. At night, she lit it and looked at him, and a drop of tallow fell on his forehead, waking him. He told her that if she had waited another month, he would have been free of an evil witch queen's spell, but now he must go to the witch's realm and become her husband. He rushed off, but she seized his fur and rode him, though the branches battered her, until she was so tired that she fell off.

The princess searched in a forest until she came to a cottage where an old woman and a little girl were. The old woman told her that the bear had gone by; the little girl had a scissors that, whenever she cut in the air, silk and velvet appeared, but she said the woman had more need of it, and gave it to her. She went on to another hut, with another old woman and little girl. This time, the little girl gave her a flask that poured whatever was wished for and never emptied. She went on to a third hut, where the little girl gave her a cloth that could conjure up food. The fourth night, the princess came to a hut where an old woman had many children who cried for food and had no clothing. The princess fed and clothed them, so the old woman had her husband, a smith, make her iron claws so she could climb the mountainside to the witch's country.

The princess reached the witch's castle. She started to clip out cloth. The witch offered to trade for them; the princess insisted on a night with her sweetheart, but the witch agreed but drugged him with a sleeping potion, so that she could not wake him. The next day, she bribed her way in with the flask; again the witch had put him to sleep, but an artisan next door heard her and told the king. The third day, she bribed her way in with the cloth, and the king had not drunk the drink, and they could talk. They come up with an idea how to kill the witch.

And so the day arrived when the king was to marry the witch, and witches from various lands came there for this occasion. But the king had carpenters put a hidden trapdoor in a bridge over a deep chasm where the wedding procession would ride, and so the witch-bride fell through it along with all of her bridesmaids. With the forces of evil destroyed, and the curse broken, the king and the princess took the treasures from the witch's castle and then went to his homeland for the real wedding. On the way, they took the little girls, and the princess learned that they were her own daughters, whom the king had taken so they could aid her in her quest.

Analysis

Tale type
The tale is classified in the Aarne-Thompson-Uther Index as type ATU 425A, "The Animal (Monster) as Bridegroom". According to Hans-Jörg Uther, the main feature of tale type ATU 425A is "bribing the false bride for three nights with the husband". In fact, when he developed his revision of Aarne-Thompson's system, Uther remarked that an "essential" trait of the tale type ATU 425A was the "wife's quest and gifts" and "nights bought".

Motifs
According to 's study on some 1,100 variants of Cupid and Psyche and related types, he concluded that the bear is the "most usual" form of the supernatural husband in Germanic and Slavonic areas.

In some tales, before the separation from her supernatural husband, the wife's children are taken from her and hidden elsewhere. Scholarship locates this motif across Celtic and Germanic speaking areas.

Variants

Denmark
In a Danish variant collected by Danish author  with the title Prins Hvidbjørn ("Prince Whitebear") and published in 1823, a king with three daughters is visited by a white bear. The king sends his daughters to shoo away the animal. The bears asks each princess to climb on his back, but only the third agrees. He departs with the princess and stops by a cave - their new home, for the next years. He tells her he becomes a prince at night, and, if she does not light any lamp at night for the next seven years, he will be disenchanted. They live like this for the next six years: she visits her family on her sister's weddings and on her father's birthday. She disobeys her husband and breaks his trust. The prince returns to ursine form and takes the princess to his sisters. They give her a golden bowl, a golden hat and a third golden object - all items she will use to bribe the false bride for three nights with her husband. Norwegian scholar Jørgen Moe noted the resemblance between Winther's tale and the Norwegian tale East of the Sun and West of the Moon.

Author Svend Grundtvig collected a variant from Vendsyssel, titled Hvidebjørn kongens søn ("Whitebear King's Son"): a king, father of four daughters, rides his horse through a meadow and begins to sink into the ground. A bear appears and offers his help, in exchange for the king's youngest daughter. Twice he refuses, but on the third time relents. The bear appears at court to get the girl, but the king tries to trick the bear by giving him servants' daughters. The bear eventually gets the princess and marries her. They live together and she gives birth to three children that the bear takes from her and hides elsewhere. The princess visits her family on the occasion on her sisters' weddings. After the third wedding, the princess decides to see who her husband really is, by lighting a lamp at night. The prince wakes and, feeling betrayed, reveals he was enchanted and a maiden who could love him without seeing his true face for seven years could have broken the curse. The prince becomes a bear and takes the princess to his three sisters, who are taking care of their children and each gives the princess three golden objects (a golden medal, a golden thread and another golden object). The bear takes her to the foot of the Glass Mountain and leaves her there. A blacksmith fashions her a pair of iron shoes so she can climb the steep mountain. The princess uses the three golden objects to bribe the false bride for three nights with her husband. The tale was republished in 1970 with its classification: AT 425A.

Folktale collector Jens Kamp collected another Danish variant from  Vendsyssel with the title Prinds Hvidbjørn ("Prince White-Bear"). In this tale, a king has three daughters, the youngest his favourite and his two elders haughty and proud. One day, the king enters a mist-covered forest, when a bear appears and promises to help him in exchange for his youngest daughter. The king refuses twice and continues his way, but on the third time, he accepts the offer. Some time later, the bear visits the king to get the third princess, but the man tricks and passes his two elders as the princess. The bear asks the girl a riddle to check the girl's identity and only the third princess answers it. The bear takes the princess to a splendid castle. They live as husband and wife and she gives birth to three children in the next years, two boys and a girl. However, the bear takes her children away from her. She laments over the fact that she cannot see her children, so at least she can see her family. The bear agrees to take her to her sister's wedding, but warns her to only listen to her father, not to her mother nor her sisters. The princess is told by her mother and sisters to light a candle at night to see his true face. She returns to the bear's castle and does just that; she sees a handsome man on her bed and inclines to kiss him, but three drops of candlewax fall on his chest. The bear awakes and tells his wife she should have waited for seven years for his curse to be broken, but now it is late. He becomes a bear and takes the princess to his sisters' castles, where their children are being cared for. Each of her sisters-in-law gives her a dress and a golden object: she gets from the first a golden dress and a spinning wheel, from the second a silver dress and a golden heel, and from the third a bronze dress and a golden thread-winder. The bear departs without her and arrives at the Glass Mountain. Meanwhile, the princess meets a blacksmith who fashions her a pair of metal shoes to climb the mountain. She does and arrives at a castle, where she finds work as a servant. Her husband is to be married to his stepmother's daughter, and the princess uses the dresses and golden objects to trade for three nights with her husband.

Author Evald Tang Kristensen published a Danish tale titled Hvidbjörn kongesön ("Whitebear King's Son"): a king is riding his horse when it becomes stuck in the mud and cannot move. A white bear appears and offers his help, in exchange for the king's youngest daughter as his bride. The king refuses at first, but, seeing that he horse is slowly sinking, decides to agree to the bear's terms. The king returns home and tries to deceive the bear by sending two maidservants in the princess's clothes, but he discovers the ruse and angrily demands the princess, as it was part of their deal. The king delivers his daughter to the white bear and the animal takes the girl to the woods. At night, she sleeps and someone comes to her bedside. Time passes, and the bear tells her that her elder sister is getting married, and takes her to the wedding, with a warning that she is to listen to her father, not her mother. She visits her parents and mentions that she sleeps in the dark at night, and her mother gives her a flint to beeter see it at night. She goes back home and bears a son who the bear takes away. Next, her middle sister is getting married, and the bear takes her to visit her parents for the merry occasion. Again, she talks to her mother, who gives her some candles. She then gives birth to another boy, who is also taken by the bear to another place. Finally, the princess third sister is also getting married, and the bear takes her to attend the wedding. After a while, she also gives birth to a third boy, who is taken by the bear. Some time later, the princess decides to light the candle her mother gave her on the white bear, and discovers he is a human prince. A drop of candlewax falls on hsi body and he wakes up. He then explains a witch cursed him into bear form, and alternated between ursine form by day and human shape at night, and if she had lived with him in the cave for 4 years without lighting a candle, he would have turned back into human. The bear takes her on his back and they pass by three apple trees, one of copper, another of silver and the third of golden, which the bear tells the princess to pluck. Next, they pass by three houses that belong to the bear's sisters, where the princess trades the apples to her children for a goldenrod (in the first house), a silver willow tree (in the second house) and a copper yarn. At last they reach a glass mountain, which the white bear climbs but leaves his wife at the foot. The princess commissions some iron shoes from a nearby blacksmith and scales the mountain. Up there, she meets a witch, whom she gives the three metallic objects so she can spend a night in her husband's quarters. She tries to wake him up on the first two nights, but the witch has given him a sleeping potion; and only manages to wake him up on the third night. He recognizes her and decides to kill the witch and her daughter with a steel sword. It happens so, and the glass mountain crumbles apart to reveal the prince's golden castle, where he lives with the princess and his three children.

In another tale collected from Gjern by Kristensen with the title Hvibekongens søn ("Whiteking's Son"), a gentleman has three daughters. Before he leaves on a trip, he asks his daughters what he can bring them: the elder asks for a golden rod, the middle one for a golden hinge and the youngest for a flower like a 'violen". The man buys the golden objects his elders requested, but cannot find the flower, until he passes by a garden and plucks the flower. When he tries to mount on his horse, someone grabs his leg and warns him to give in return the first thing that greets him. The gentleman agrees, thinking his little white dog will be the one to greet him, but, when he goes back home, it is his youngest daughter. Remembering the voice at the garden, he tries to renege on the deal by sending two maidservants in the girl's place: for two consecutive nights, a maidservant waits outside the house, and someone comes and asks her to climb onto their back. The person discovers the ruse and demands the youngest daughter. The man relents and delives his daughter to the person, who takes her to a magnificent castle. The voice tells her not to light anything in the castle at night, and they live like this. At one time, the girl gives birth to a boy who the voice brings to his sister. Some time later, the girl's elder daughter is getting married, and the voice allows her to pay them a visit, but warns her to listen to her father, not her mother. Next, she has two other sons in consecutive pregnancies, who are taken by the voice and given to the voice's kin. Finally, the girl's other sister is getting married, and she is allowed to visit them. On this occasion, her mother gives her a candle and matches, so she can use them to illuminate her room at night. Back to the voice's palace, she lights the candle and sees a handsome man at her bedside, but drops some waxcandle on his body. He wakes up and adminishes his wife, explaining that he is a king's son, cursed to marry a witch that lives on a glass mountain southwards of the sun, westward of the moon, and three miles east of the Tower of Babylon. The girl agrees to accompany him during his journey to the glass mountain, and they pass by three houses that belong to his three siblings. In the first house, shining like the Moon, she finds one of her children playing with a golden nut, which her sister-in-law gives her. Next, they pass by the prince's brother's house, where the girl finds another son, and is given a golden acorn. Lastly, they pass by the third house, who irradiated light like a rising Sun, where she finds her third child and is given a golden apple. At last, they reach the glass mountain, which he manages to climb and brings his wife up, but she slips down to its foot. Fortunately, the girl asks a blacksmith to fashion iron instruments she uses to climb the slippery mountain and enter the witch's castle. The girl takes out the golden fruits to bribe the witch for a night with her husband, managing to talk to him on the third night. He recognizes her and they hatch a plan to punish the witch. The next morning, the girl sits at the table and narrates her story. The witch mocks her tale, and the prince asks her how they should punish a person who tries to keep two people apart. Without realizing it, the witch pronounces her own sentence, which is duly carried out. The prince and his wife live together in the castle atop the glass mountain.

Sweden
In a Swedish tale titled Prinz Vilius ("Prince Vilius"), a king gets lost in the woods, when a bear appears to help him in exchange for the first thing that greets him when he returns home. Unfortunately for him, it is his daughter that greets him. The white bear. Vilius, comes to take the girl as his wife. The white bear becomes human at night, and remains a bear during the day. They have seven children together and one day the girl wants to visit her family. The girl goes to her father's house and her stepmother convinces her to spy on Vilius at night. She follows her instructions and light a candle to better see him. A drop of wax falls on his body and he wakes up with a startle. Vilius admonishes his wife that he must disappear to a place beyond the Earth and the Sun. The girl goes after him with their seven children, and stops by three old ladies' houses, the first the Mistress of Bears, the second the Mistress of Lions and the third the Mistress of Falcons. The third lady directs her to a castle where Vilius is living with a new wife named Frau Sonne. A falcon takes the girl to the castle. She takes out golden spinning instruments to bribe Frau Sonne for three nights with her husband.

In an archival Finnish-Swedish tale reported by Finnish folklorist Oskar Hackman and collected from Ekenäs, a king loses his way into a dense forest, until a white bear appears to him and offers its help, in exchange for the king's youngest daughter. The king returns to his castle and tries to worm his way out of the white bear's deal by delivering another girl in his daughter's place. The white bear notices the deception twice and gets the princess as his bride. The princess lives in the bear's castle, where he comes at night in human shape, but she cannot see his true forme. She gives birth to three children in the next three years, and one day, missing home, wants to visit her family. The white bear lets her leave to visit her family, but warns her against listening to her mother's advice. The princess talks to her mother about the mysterious bedmate, and is given a candle and a box of matches. The princess returns home and, on the same night, lights the candle to see her husband. The man awakes and reveals that he is a prince cursed by a witch to be a bear for scorning her daughter's advances, and now they have to part. The prince turns back into a bear and takes the children with him. The princess follows after him and visits three farms. In every farm, she is gifted a golden härvel (tool for spinning yarn), a golden ball and three golden apples. She eventually reaches the foot of a steep mountain, but cannot climb it. She is hired by a blacksmith who fashions her some climbing equipment. She finally climbs the mountain and enter the troll queen's castle. The troll queen forcers the princess to perform chores for her: first, to get a coal from the cellar and put it back; second, to wash a grey calfskin white. The princess's husband, in human form, helps her in both tasks, and advises her not to eat any food the troll queen serves her. The princess goes to dinner with the troll queen, but hides the food in her bosom to trick the troll queen. Finally, the troll queen orders the princess to visit another witch's house. Her husband advises her to grease a creeking bridge, give bread to two dogs and gloves to two men that are threshing grain, and oil a door. The princess follows his instructions and visits the second witch. The second witch orders the door, the men, the dogs and bridge to destroy her, but the princess escapes. Some time later, the princess uses the golden härvel, the golden ball and the three golden apples to bribe the troll queen's daughter for three nights with her husband.

In media 
The film The Polar Bear King (Kvitebjørn Kong Valemon) is based on this fairy tale.
Similar elements to this story appear in 2 episodes of The StoryTeller episodes "Hans My Hedgehog" which involve a princess marrying an enchanted man who removes his animal form at night and also in "The True Bride" where exchanges for a night with a missing prince are met with a sleeping potion prompting prisoners to inform the prince of the weeping of the True Bride each night.
Valemon is a character in Cinderella: From Fabletown with Love, and a portion of the comic is set in his kingdom.
Jessica Day George's novel Sun and Moon, Ice and Snow (based on East of the Sun and West of the Moon) references White-Bear-King-Valemon; when an enchanted bear requests the woodcutter's youngest daughter to live with a palace for one year, the woodcutter's wife recalls the story of King Valemon.
The main illustration became, in black-and-white form, the logo of the publisher Norsk Folkeminnelag.

See also

 Beauty and the Beast
 Eros and Psyche
 The Two Kings' Children
 Whitebear Whittington
 The Story of the Abandoned Princess

References

Bibliography

Projekt Runeberg edition, Kvitebjørn kong Valemon, Kvitebjørn kong Valemon

 (variant)

 Asbjørnsen, Peter Christen, Jørgen Moe, Pat Shaw, and Carl Norman. “White-Bear-King-Valemon”. In: Merveilles & Contes 3, no. 1 (1989): 115–20. http://www.jstor.org/stable/41389996.
Erik Henning Edvardsen: Kvitebjørn kong Valemon 1. Gerhard August Schneider - arkitekten bak norske evnetyrillustrasjoner. Norsk Folkeminnelags skrifter nr. 155. Aschehoug. . Oslo 2005.
Erik Henning Edvardsen: Kvitebjørn kong Valemon 2. Gerhard August Schneider - den illustrerte eventyrutgaven som aldri utkom. Norsk Folkeminnelags skrifter nr. 157. Aschehoug. . Oslo 2007.

Further reading
 Henderson, Lizanne. "Chapter 23. Bear Tales: Ways of Seeing Polar Bears in Mythology, Traditional Folktales and Modern-Day Children’s Literature". In: Brugué, Lydia; and Llompart, Auba, eds. Contemporary Fairy-Tale Magic. Leiden, The Netherlands: Brill, 13 Jan. 2020. pp. 250–261. https://doi.org/10.1163/9789004418998

Fictional kings
Fictional polar bears
Norwegian fairy tales
Fiction about shapeshifting
Witchcraft in fairy tales
ATU 400-459